Hugo Cardoso Porfírio (born 28 September 1973) is a Portuguese former professional footballer who played mostly as a winger.

He amassed Primeira Liga totals of 86 games and ten goals over the course of nine seasons, representing five clubs. He also competed in England, Spain and Saudi Arabia.

Porfírio appeared for Portugal at Euro 1996.

Club career
Born in Lisbon, Porfírio graduated from Sporting CP's prolific youth academy, joining the professionals for the 1992–93 season alongside Emílio Peixe. After some appearances as a substitute, he had loan spells with fellow Primeira Liga clubs F.C. Tirsense and U.D. Leiria.

Porfírio returned to the Estádio José Alvalade for 1996–97, but soon moved on loan to England's West Ham United. There, he scored four goals in all competitions, against Nottingham Forest in the third round of the League Cup, Wrexham in the same stage of the FA Cup and Blackburn Rovers and Chelsea in the Premier League.

Released by Sporting in June 1997, Porfírio spent the following campaign with La Liga's Racing de Santander. He only netted once during his spell in Cantabria, in a 2–2 draw at CD Tenerife, and was also sent off twice as his team went on to finish in 14th position.

Porfírio signed with Sporting neighbours S.L. Benfica for 1998–99, being loaned in the January transfer window to Nottingham Forest where he appeared sparingly and scored once, against Sheffield Wednesday. He returned to Benfica in July, terminating his contract for unpaid salaries, joining C.S. Marítimo in August on a free transfer but returning to the former at the end of the season after reaching amicable terms; after a brief spell in the first team, he was soon demoted to the reserves where he would spend almost two years, severing his ties in February 2004.

Subsequently, Porfírio had short spells, playing with modest Portuguese sides (S.U. 1º Dezembro and Clube Oriental de Lisboa) and retiring in 2008 after a season in Saudi Arabia with Al Nassr FC. In February 2012, he was named by manager Ricardo Sá Pinto as part of his backroom team at Sporting. He left his post in the club's scouting department in April 2013.

International career
After impressive displays with Leiria, Porfírio earned an international callup to the Portugal national team. After making his debut on 29 May 1996 in a 1–0 defeat of Ireland in Dublin, he made the nation's squad of 22 for UEFA Euro 1996, playing 15 minutes in the 1–0 group stage win against Turkey.

Some months later, Porfírio was also in the roster at the 1996 Olympic Games, where Portugal finished fourth, their best result ever in the competition. On 9 November he received his last cap for the full side, a 1–0 home victory over Ukraine for the 1998 FIFA World Cup qualifiers.

References

External links

1973 births
Living people
Footballers from Lisbon
Portuguese footballers
Association football wingers
Primeira Liga players
Segunda Divisão players
Sporting CP footballers
F.C. Tirsense players
U.D. Leiria players
S.L. Benfica footballers
C.S. Marítimo players
S.L. Benfica B players
S.U. 1º Dezembro players
Clube Oriental de Lisboa players
Premier League players
West Ham United F.C. players
Nottingham Forest F.C. players
La Liga players
Racing de Santander players
Al Nassr FC players
Portugal youth international footballers
Portugal under-21 international footballers
Portugal international footballers
UEFA Euro 1996 players
Olympic footballers of Portugal
Footballers at the 1996 Summer Olympics
Portuguese expatriate footballers
Expatriate footballers in England
Expatriate footballers in Spain
Expatriate footballers in Saudi Arabia
Portuguese expatriate sportspeople in England
Portuguese expatriate sportspeople in Spain
Portuguese expatriate sportspeople in Saudi Arabia